Anna-Louise Plowman (born 9 May 1972) is a New Zealand actress.

Early life and education
Plowman was born in New Zealand. She attended Samuel Marsden Collegiate School, Wellington, between 1982 and 1989, and then the London Academy of Music and Dramatic Art and the Lecoq School in Paris.

Career
She played consultant anaesthetist Annalese Carson in Holby City and Sarah Gardner/Osiris in Stargate SG-1. In 2003 she played Melinda MacLean, wife of British communist spy Donald Maclean, and mistress of spy Kim Philby (played by her husband Toby Stephens), in the TV mini-series Cambridge Spies.

She played Diana Goddard in the Doctor Who story "Dalek" in 2005. Plowman also played the role of "C" in a revival of Edward Albee's play, Three Tall Women, in 2006, at the Oxford Playhouse.

From 2016 to 2017, she played chamber maid Mrs Hudson in the series Black Sails, which also starred Toby Stephens.

Personal life 
Plowman married actor Toby Stephens, who is the son of actors Dame Maggie Smith and the late Sir Robert Stephens, in London, in 2001. In May 2007, Plowman and Stephens had their first child, a son named Eli Alistair. Simon Gray, the renowned British playwright (who wrote Japes, a stage play, and Missing Dates, a radio drama, both of which starred Stephens), was Eli's godfather. Their daughters, Tallulah and Kura, were born in May 2009 and in September 2010, respectively.

Plowman and Stephens performed together as Sibyl and Elyot in Jonathan Kent's revival of Private Lives for the 2012 Chichester Festival, reprised at the Gielgud Theatre in 2013.

Filmography

References

External links
 

1972 births
Alumni of the London Academy of Music and Dramatic Art
New Zealand television actresses
Living people
New Zealand expatriates in England
20th-century British actresses
21st-century British actresses
People educated at Samuel Marsden Collegiate School